The Anglican Diocese of Irele-Eseodo is one of twelve within the Anglican Province of Ondo, itself one of 14 provinces within the Church of Nigeria.

The founding bishop was  Felix Akinbuluma, who was Bishop from 2009 until his death in 2018. The current bishop is Joshua Oyinlola, who was elected in 2019.

Bishops

Notes

Dioceses of the Province of Ondo
Church of Nigeria dioceses